Valentin Ivanovich Afonin (22 December 1939 – 2 April 2021) was a Soviet footballer who played as a defender.

International career
He played for Soviet Union national team (42 matches), and was a participant at the 1966 FIFA World Cup, 1970 FIFA World Cup and at the 1968 UEFA European Football Championship.

Honours
 Soviet Top League: 1970
 Soviet Top League runner-up: 1966
 Top 33 players year-end list: 1968, 1969, 1970

External links 
 RussiaTeam biography 
 Weltfussball 

1939 births
2021 deaths
People from Vladimir, Russia
Sportspeople from Vladimir Oblast
Russian footballers
Soviet footballers
Association football defenders
Soviet Union international footballers
1966 FIFA World Cup players
UEFA Euro 1968 players
1970 FIFA World Cup players
Soviet Top League players
PFC CSKA Moscow players
FC SKA Rostov-on-Don players
FC SKA-Khabarovsk managers
Russian football managers
FC Torpedo Vladimir players